Hilarographa excellens is a species of moth of the family Tortricidae. It is found on the Bismarck Islands in the western Pacific Ocean.

References

Moths described in 1900
Hilarographini